The 2010–11 season was the 122nd season of competitive football by Celtic. New manager Neil Lennon made considerable changes to the Celtic team for the 2010–11 season. He sold Aiden McGeady for a then Scottish record £9.5 million along with captain Stephen McManus and fan favourite Artur Boruc. 13 other players also left the club, this gave Lennon enough funds to re-build for the new season. He looked to sign talented, young, cheap, relatively unknown players, from smaller leagues around the world. This paid off with players such as Gary Hooper, Beram Kayal and Emilio Izaguirre all having excellent seasons and earning many plaudits. Lennon also signed several experienced players on free transfers. Charlie Mulgrew, Joe Ledley, and Daniel Majstorović all went into the first team. In addition to these Lennon also signed five other players, including Fraser Forster on loan from Newcastle who became first choice goalkeeper and helped set a new SPL record for most clean sheets.

In July Celtic were drawn in the third qualifying round of the UEFA Champions League against Portuguese side Braga. Celtic lost the first leg of the tie 3–0 away from home. Celtic won the return leg 2–1, but went out of the Champions League 4–2 on aggregate. Celtic were knocked out of European football altogether in August, after they lost their Europa League qualifying match against FC Utrecht 4–2 on aggregate.

Celtic won their first eight league games of the SPL season, before losing to Rangers, who also had a 100% record, 3–1. Celtic started November beating Aberdeen 9–0 in an SPL record victory. They then lost to Hearts and drew at home against Dundee United and Inverness Caledonian Thistle, with a victory over St Mirren the only consolation. The Inverness match was notable because it was officiated by Luxembourg referee Alain Hamer, who had stepped in because of the Scottish football referee strike. Celtic began 2011 by beating Rangers 2–0 at Ibrox, and beat their rivals again 3–0 on 20 February. Celtic finished the season in second place in the SPL table, a point behind Rangers.

In the League Cup, Celtic beat Inverness 6–0 and St Johnstone 3–2 before beating Aberdeen in the semi-final. In the final, they lost 2–1 to Rangers after extra time. In the Scottish Cup, Celtic entered in the fourth round, beating Third Division team Berwick Rangers 2–0, and drawing 2–2 with Rangers in the fifth round. They beat Rangers 1–0 in the replay and booked their place in the final beating Aberdeen 4–0 at Hampden Park. In the final Celtic beat Motherwell 3–0, with goals scored by Ki Sung-Yeung, Charlie Mulgrew and an own goal from Stephen Craigan.

Celtic played in an unprecedented seven Old Firm matches in 2010–11. This was due to being drawn against Rangers in both cups, and the fact that they required a replay to beat them in the Scottish Cup. Celtic won three of these matches, two in the league and the Scottish Cup fifth round replay. There were two draws, one in the final league match and one in the Scottish Cup fifth round. Rangers won twice, both the first league match and the League Cup final. Celtic also enjoyed an incredible run of results against Aberdeen. The two teams played each other five times, due to being drawn in both Cup semi-finals and Celtic scored 21 times against them only conceding one.

Transfers

Players in 

Total spend: £10.2 million

Players out 

Total sales: £15.9 million

Competitions

Scottish Premier League

Results summary

UEFA Champions League

UEFA Europa League

Scottish League Cup

Scottish Cup

Player statistics

Appearances and goals

List of squad players, including number of appearances by competition

|}

Disciplinary record

Top scorers

Team statistics

League table

Technical staff

Celtic personnel awards

See also
 List of Celtic F.C. seasons

References

External links
 

2010-11
Scottish football clubs 2010–11 season
2010–11 UEFA Europa League participants seasons